The 1979 international cricket season extended from May to August 1979.

Season overview

May

1979 ICC Trophy

Group A

Group B

{
Group C

June

1979 Cricket World Cup

July

India in England

References

1979 in cricket